Floortje Engels (born 15 February 1982 in Amersfoort) is a Dutch field hockey player, who plays as a goalkeeper for Dutch club Amsterdam HBC. She also plays for the Netherlands national team and was part of the Dutch squad that became 2007 Champions Trophy winner.

References

External links
 

1982 births
Living people
Dutch female field hockey players
Female field hockey goalkeepers
Sportspeople from Amersfoort
20th-century Dutch women
21st-century Dutch women